Beef Hatkhora also known as Sylheti Beef;  is a Sylheti cuisine consisting of rice, satkara citrus, and beef curry. Whilst having its origins in the Sylhet Division, the dish has now gained popularity across the country and among the British Bangladeshi diaspora in the United Kingdom. At the time of Eid-ul-Adha, it is a famous dish. The presence of a citrus fruit makes the dish unique among Bangladeshi curries in terms of taste and aroma. A soupy variant of the dish is made with the bones of cow feet, and in other variants, the beef is sometimes replaced with fish or other meats.

Ingredients 
Vegetable oil, cinnamon, cardamom, fenugreek seeds, salt, onions, paste of garlic and ginger, beef chuck, chilli powder, turmeric, ground coriander and cumin, garam masala, Hatkora and a tomato.

Procedure 
Oil is heated in a large, heavy bottomed, non-stick saucepan. Then cinnamon, bay leaves, cardamom, star anise and fenugreek seeds are added to reheat for swirling in the oil to release the flavours. Adding beef, salt, spices and green chilies it is stirred for a while and then covered. Cutting the piece of Hatkhora into wedges and then chop each wedge into small pieces. Hatkhora is added then followed up some hot water. When the curry is boiled, it is simmered for a while. After that chopped coriander is added until the meat is tender.

Serve
The dish is served with glutinous rice or boiled white rice, a salad of cucumber, tomatoes and onions are used as a side dish. It is also eaten with Pilau, Khichdi and Paratha.

See also 

 Bengali cuisine
 List of beef dishes

References

Sylheti cuisine
Curry dishes
Beef dishes
Bangladeshi meat dishes